Chakrapani may refer to:

People with the surname 
 Aluri Chakrapani (1908–1975), Indian film multilingual writer, producer and director
 Chuck Chakrapani, Indian research methodologist, educator, and author
 M. G. Chakrapani (1911–1986), Indian actor in the Tamil film industry
 Ghanta Chakrapani (born 1965), Indian sociologist, journalist and political analyst in Telugu media

People with the given name 
Chakrapani (politician), Indian political activist and ascetic
Chakrapani Chalise (1883–1958), Nepalese poet
Chakrapani Datta, 11th century Bengali physician and scholar
Chakrapani Khanal, Nepalese politician
Chakrapani Shukla (born 1916), Indian politician

Other uses 
Chakrapani Temple, Kumbakonam, Tamil Nadu, India
 Chakrapani (film), a 1954 Telugu-language film

Indian masculine given names